Livenka is a rural locality (a selo) in Krasnogvardeysky District of Belgorod Oblast, Russia, located  from the town of Biryuch, the administrative center of the district. Population:

History

It was founded in 1681 by Vasily Livenets as an outpost settlement.  

The settlement now encompasses the site where the Battle of Nikolayevka (named according to the Second World War Italian military maps) was fought between Italian and Soviet forces in January 1943.

Geography
The village, crossed in the middle by the river Valuy, lies 25 km south of Biryuch, the district capital, and 47 km north of Valuyki. It is 75 km far from Ukrainian border, in Kharkiv Oblast.

References

Notes

Sources

External links

Rural localities in Krasnogvardeysky District, Belgorod Oblast